Steiglitz may refer to:
 Steiglitz, Queensland
 Steiglitz, Victoria

See also
 Stieglitz (disambiguation)
 Stiglitz (disambiguation)